Canal Vasco ("Basque channel" in Spanish) is the name that the Euskal Irrati Telebista group uses to broadcast its international television channel, ETB Sat, via satellite and CATV operators in the Americas.

This channel brings Basque-language television and Basque culture to the large Basque community residing in the Americas, as well as other citizens of these areas. Its programming is based primarily on self-produced content from the domestic flagship channels ETB 1 and ETB 2.

See also
Euskal Irrati Telebista
ETB 1
ETB 2
ETB 3
ETB 4
ETB Sat

EITB
International broadcasters
Mass media in Bilbao
FORTA
Television stations in Spain
Television stations in Central America
Television stations in Mexico
Television channels and stations established in 1996